Casselman is a village in eastern Ontario, Canada, in the United Counties of Prescott and Russell. It is served by a station on the Montreal-Ottawa Via Rail train, twice a day in each direction.

Casselman is surrounded on all sides by The Nation since Casselman citizens refused to join the fusion of municipalities.

The village was named after Martin Casselman who built a sawmill near the site of the current town in 1844.  Its post office was established in 1857. The village installed modern water and sewer services that became operational in 1977.

Casselman hosted L'écho d'un peuple, at Ferme Drouin, one of the biggest shows ever presented in Ontario, until the organization ran into financial trouble in 2008.

Demographics

Mother tongue:
 French as first language: 79.3%
 English as first language: 17.4%
 English and French as first language: 1.9%
 Other as first language: 1.4%

See also
 Transit Eastern Ontario operates under the authority of The North Glengarry Prescott Russell (NGPR) Transport Board
List of francophone communities in Ontario

References

External links

Lower-tier municipalities in Ontario
Municipalities in the United Counties of Prescott and Russell
Villages in Ontario